The Hawk of Powder River is a 1948 American Western film directed by Ray Taylor.

Cast
Eddie Dean as Deputy Marshal Eddie Dean
White Cloud as Eddie's Horse
Roscoe Ates as Soapy Jones
Jennifer Holt as Vivian Chambers aka The Hawk
June Carlson as Carole Chambers
Eddie Parker as Mike Cochrane, the lawyer
Terry Frost as Henchman Mitchell
Lane Bradford as Henchman Cooper
Carl Mathews as Henchman
Ted French as Henchman Carson
Steve Clark as Bill Chambers
Tex Palmer as Stage driver Charlie
Andy Parker as Cowhand / Musician
The Plainsmen as Cowhands / Musicians

Soundtrack
 "Black Hills" (by Eddie Dean and Hal Blair)
 "Wild Country" (by Eddie Dean and Hal Blair)
 "Punchinello" (by Pete Gates)
 "Rose Anne of San Jose" (by Pete Gates)

External links

1948 films
American black-and-white films
Producers Releasing Corporation films
1948 Western (genre) films
American Western (genre) films
Eagle-Lion Films films
Films directed by Ray Taylor
1940s English-language films
1940s American films